The B 82500 (often referred to as BGC or BiBi) is a class of dual-mode, multi-system, diesel and overhead electrification (1.5 kV DC, 25 kV AC) powered multiple unit built by Bombardier for SNCF. It is one variant of the Autorail à Grande Capacité. These trains were built at Bombardier's rail manufacturing plant in Crespin.

The class was officially launched at Troyes station on 9 October 2007 for service on the TER Champagne-Ardenne network.

References

External links

B 82500
Bombardier Transportation multiple units
Hybrid multiple units of France

25 kV AC multiple units
1500 V DC multiple units of France